WLSB may refer to:

 WLSB (FM), a radio station (98.5 FM) licensed to serve Augusta, Illinois, United States
 WLYY, a radio station (1400 AM) licensed to serve Copper Hill, Tennessee, United States, which held the call sign WLSB until 2013